The gray dorcopsis or gray forest wallaby (Dorcopsis luctuosa) is a species of marsupial in the family Macropodidae. It is found in West Papua and Papua New Guinea.

Description

The gray dorcopsis has a long muzzle and small, rounded ears. The forelegs are relatively longer in comparison to the hind legs than they are in most other members of the family Macropodidae. The tail is long and has a bare, cornified tip. The short, dense fur is smokey-grey above and paler grey beneath, with a yellowish patch around the single cloacal orifice. Males are much larger than females, a male weighing up to  while a female reaches .

Distribution and habitat
Its habitat is tropical primary and secondary forest, in particular gallery forest, and it is also found in disturbed areas such as abandoned gardens.

Status
The major threats experienced by the gray dorcopsis are the loss of its forest habitat through timber extraction and conversion to small-scale agriculture and the fact that it is hunted for bushmeat. In the vicinity of Port Moresby it has been hunted intensively and few animals remain. It used to be found in the nearby Varirata National Park but it is unclear whether it is still present there. Because of the hunting pressure on this animal, the IUCN believes the population is in decline and lists it as being "Vulnerable". It advocates ongoing monitoring and assessment.

References

External links

Macropods
Mammals of Papua New Guinea
Mammals of Western New Guinea
Mammals described in 1874
Taxa named by Luigi D'Albertis
Taxonomy articles created by Polbot
Marsupials of New Guinea